Aparallactus niger is a species of venomous rear-fanged snake in the family Atractaspididae. It is endemic to Western Africa.

Geographic range
It is found in Guinea, Sierra Leone, Liberia, and Ivory Coast.

Description
Aparallactus niger is completely black dorsally, to which the specific name, niger, refers. Ventrally, the ventral scales are white, edged with black, and the subcaudal scales are black in the middle and on the posterior and outer borders.

The dorsal scales are arranged in 15 rows. Ventrals 164; anal plate entire; subcaudals 60.

Portion of rostral visible from above ⅓ as long as its distance from the frontal. Internasals slightly broader than long, widely separated from the preocular. A single prefrontal, forming sutures with the nasal and the preocular. Frontal nearly 1½ times as long as broad, as long as its distance from the end of the snout, much shorter than the parietals. Nasal semidivided, in contact with the preocular. Two postoculars. A single temporal. Seven upper labials, third and fourth entering the eye, fifth and sixth in contact with the parietal. First lower labial in contact with its fellow behind the mental. Four lower labials in contact with anterior chin shield. Anterior chin shields longer than posterior chin shields.

References

Atractaspididae
Reptiles described in 1897